Bargachia is a census town in Jagatballavpur CD Block of Howrah Sadar subdivision in Howrah district in the Indian state of West Bengal. It is 25 km from the state's capital, Kolkata. The nearest towns are Jagatballavpur, Domjur, Pantihal, Garbalia and Munsirhat.

Transport

Amta Road (part of State Highway 15) is the artery of the town. Bargachia-Jagatballavpur Road also starts from here.

Bus

Government bus 
C11/1 Munsirhat- Howrah
E12 Udaynarayanpur- Esplanade

Public Bus
 E44 Rampur - Howrah Station

Mini Bus
 34 Purash - Howrah Station
 35 Hantal- Howrah Station

Bus Route Without Number
 Pancharul - Howrah Station
 Garbhawanipur- Rubi Hospital
 Sealdah-Bargachia

Train
Bargachia railway station is situated at Bargachia on Howra-Amta line under Kharagpur railway division of South Eastern railway zone.

Banks
In Bargachia town there is several Govt Banks such as Paschim Banga Gramin Bank, SBI, UCO Bank as well as Private sector banks such as IDBI Bank, Bandhan Bank .

References 

Cities and towns in Howrah district